Kimberly Chia is a Singaporean actress.

Early life and education 
Chia graduated from Compassvale Secondary School in 2011. Whilst she had wanted to study at LASALLE College of the Arts upon graduating, having received lower than expected grades for her GCE 'O' Levels, with the ELR2B2 score 2 points higher than expected, Chia then studied at Singapore Institute of Management for a diploma in Management Studies.

Career
Chia started as a model at age 3. She was a print ad model for various companies, as well as a runway model in fashion shows. She picked up dancing, singing and acting afterwards, and participated in several MediaCorp dramas at the age of 9. Her first major role came with Fighting Spiders in 2009. Chia then rose to fame after starring in drama On the Fringe 2011, and was subsequently given a role in Singaporean movie Timeless Love, directed by Lim Koong Hwee and Dasmond Koh.

Chia became the spokesperson for Norton 360 Multi-Device together with Xu Bin and Aloysius Pang in March 2013, and Osim's uSlender product in May 2013.

In December 2015, Chia announced that she would be going for acting course for two years and would not be participating in any drama for the next two years.

On 1 January 2016, Chia released her first single, Love Radio ( Radio), where she made her singing debut.

Between 2016 and 2018, Chia was an air stewardess with Singapore Airlines.

In 2018, Chia returned to acting and acted in a Toggle drama series, Love at Cavenagh Bridge, where she acted as lovers with Aloysius Pang. She also acted in a Channel 8 drama called Say Cheese where she played lovers with Zong Zijie.

Chia would be involved as another supporting role in another Channel 8 Production drama called Heart To Heart.

Personal life
Chia was married in 2021, to a businessman 8 years older than her. At the same time, she announced that she was expecting her first child. On 4 May 2022, Chia announced that she had given birth to a boy.

Filmography

Film

Television

Discography

Singles

Awards and accolades

References

External links
 Kimberly Chia profile on NoonTalk Media

1995 births
Living people
Singaporean people of Chinese descent
Singaporean television actresses
Singaporean female models
21st-century Singaporean women singers
Singaporean Mandopop singers
21st-century Singaporean actresses